Tarik Darreh-ye Bala (also Romanized as Tārīk Darreh-ye Bālā; also known as Tārīk Darreh-ye ‘Olyā) is a village in Khezel-e Sharqi Rural District, Khezel District, Nahavand County, Hamadan Province, Iran. At the 2006 census, its population was 441, in 99 families.

References 

Populated places in Nahavand County